Double Vision is the fourth live album by German hard rock band Bonfire. It was released in 2007 by LZ Records. It is a live album, recorded in England during Firefest III in Nottingham. It was billed as "a live celebration of 20 years of rock 'n' roll" by Bonfire.  A DVD of the concert was released not long after this album. Chris Limburg was in a motorcycle accident prior to this concert, which is why he was not moving around the stage as much as he usually does.

Track listing

Personnel 
Claus Lessmann - lead vocals
Hans Ziller - guitars
Chris Limburg - guitars
Uwe Köhler - bass
Jürgen Wiehler - drums

References
 Billboard's Listing of Double Vision Album

Bonfire (band) live albums
2007 live albums